Mikhail Ivanovich Kozlovsky (6 November 1753 – 30 September 1802) was a Russian Neoclassical sculptor active during the Age of Enlightenment.

Biography 
Beginning his training at the Imperial Academy of Arts with Anton Losenko in 1764, he went to Rome in 1774 and then to Paris in 1779. Although his early works harked back to the Baroque sensibility, Kozlovsky eventually succeeded in adapting his manner to Neoclassical monumentality. In 1788, he returned to Paris with the task of superintending Russian students abroad. He was appointed a professor at the Academy of Arts in 1794 and instructed young sculptors in St Petersburg until his death.

Among his classicizing works was the awesome gilt bronze statue of Samson Rending the Lion's Jaws (1800–1802), a central piece of the Grand Cascade at Peterhof Palace, symbolizing Russia's victory over Sweden in the Great Northern War. After it was looted by the invading Germans, a replacement statue was installed in 1947. Another masterpiece is the Suvorov Monument, an expressive bronze sculpture of Generalissimo Alexander Suvorov in the guise of youthful Mars. It was unveiled in the Field of Mars (Saint Petersburg) a year before the sculptor's death.

Works

References

Bibliography

External links 

Neoclassical sculptors
19th-century sculptors from the Russian Empire
19th-century male artists from the Russian Empire
18th-century sculptors from the Russian Empire
Russian male sculptors
1753 births
1802 deaths
Burials at Lazarevskoe Cemetery (Saint Petersburg)